The enzyme 4-oxalocrotonate decarboxylase catalyzes the chemical reaction

4-oxalocrotonate  2-oxopent-4-enoate + CO2

This enzyme belongs to the family of lyases, specifically the carboxy-lyases, which cleave carbon-carbon bonds.  The systematic name of this enzyme class is 4-oxalocrotonate carboxy-lyase (2-oxopent-4-enoate-forming). This enzyme is also called 4-oxalocrotonate carboxy-lyase. This enzyme participates in 3 metabolic pathways: benzoate degradation via hydroxylation, toluene and xylene degradation, and fluorene degradation.

References

 

EC 4.1.1
Enzymes of unknown structure